Leo De Clercq FRPSL is a Belgian philatelist and postal historian who was appointed to the Roll of Distinguished Philatelists in 2001. He has received the Paul de Smeth Medal (1975), the Costerus Medal (1988) and the SAVO Plakette (1993). He is a fellow of the Royal Philatelic Society London.

References

Signatories to the Roll of Distinguished Philatelists
Fellows of the Royal Philatelic Society London
Belgian philatelists
Living people
Year of birth missing (living people)